Lindholm railway station is a railway station serving the district of Lindholm in the city of Nørresundby in Vendsyssel, Denmark.

The station is located on the Vendsyssel railway line from Aalborg to Frederikshavn and is part of the Aalborg Commuter Rail service. North of Lindholm station the Aalborg Airport railway line branches west to Aalborg Airport. The station opened in 2002. The train services are operated by the railway companies DSB and Nordjyske Jernbaner.

History 

Lindholm station opened in 2002 as a part of the new Aalborg Commuter Rail service. For a year 2012–2013, there was no train service, only bus service, since the Limfjord Railway Bridge across the Limfjord between Nørresundby and Aalborg was damaged and unusable for trains due to a ship collision. In 2020 the Aalborg Airport railway line opened which branches west north of Lindholm station to Aalborg Airport and links Aalborg with its airport.

Operations 

The train services are operated by the railway companies DSB which offers direct InterCityLyn connections to Copenhagen and Aalborg Airport (using the Aalborg Airport railway line to Aalborg Airport station), and Nordjyske Jernbaner which offers direct regional train services to Aalborg, Hjørring and Frederikshavn.

References

External links

 Banedanmark – government agency responsible for maintenance and traffic control of most of the Danish railway network
 DSB – largest Danish train operating company
 Nordjyske Jernbaner – Danish railway company operating in North Jutland Region
 Danske Jernbaner – website with information on railway history in Denmark
 Nordjyllands Jernbaner – website with information on railway history in North Jutland

Nørresundby
Railway stations in Aalborg
Railway stations opened in 2002
2002 establishments in Denmark
Railway stations in Denmark opened in the 21st century